Bodegas Güell, in Catalan Celler Güell, is an architectural complex comprising a winery and associated buildings located in Garraf, in the municipality of Sitges (Barcelona), designed by the Catalan architect Antoni Gaudí.

History and description

Gaudí received the commission for this work in 1882 from his patron Eusebi Güell, who had seen Gaudí's work at the Paris Expo in 1878; in this year Gaudí received a number of other commissions including the Palau Güell, the Pabellones Güell de Pedralbes, the Park Güell and the crypt of the Church of Colònia Güell in Santa Coloma de Cervelló.

The original commission consisted of the winery and several hunting pavilions, but the latter were never built. The whole complex was located on the La Cuadra estate in Garraf, Sitges and was the property of the Count Güell. The winery buildings were finally built between 1895 and 1897, under the direction of Francesc Berenguer, Gaudí's helper.

The winery has a triangular frontal profile, with almost vertical roofs, steep sloping stone slabs, finished off with sets of chimneys and two doors that connect it to the old building. There are three floors: the ground floor for parking vehicles, an apartment on the first floor and a domed chapel on the top floor.

Count Güell actually produced wine in the winery, which was served on the ships of the Compañía Transatlántica Española shipping line and was also exported to Cuba. However, production stopped in 1936 due to lack of commercial success.

There is currently a restaurant in the Bodegas Güell.

See also
Catalan Modernism

References

Sources
Joan Bassegoda Nonell: Gaudí o espacio, luz y equilibrio, Criterio, Madrid, 2002, .

External links

bodegasguell.es
gaudiclub.com
gaudiallgaudi.com

Antoni Gaudí buildings
Modernisme architecture in Catalonia